Central Technology & Sports College was a secondary school in the north of Grantham in Lincolnshire, England. It became part of The Priory Ruskin Academy in 2010.

History

The Central School has its origins in the Central and Day Continuation School built behind the Town Hall in 1920. In the late 1920s, the school burnt down from a fire that started in the boiler room.

There later followed two single sex secondary modern schools, the Boys' Central School on Sandon Road and the Girls' Central School on Castlegate, in the town centre. The Boys' Central School was built in 1928. For two years previously the school was at Middlemore House in Castlegate.

The Girls' Central School became Walton Girls High School in 1966 on Kitty Briggs Lane, next to the newly built bypass, off the A607. Walton Girls is now an 11-18 school, with boys in the sixth form.  The former site of the Boys' Central School now houses the Little Gonerby Church of England Infant School, which moved to the site in January 1986, from its site in Albion Street it had been at since 1863. The site on Sandon Road closed on 18 March 1978.

When a boys' school, it was not a secondary modern school because admittance to the school was only through achieving a reasonable score in the eleven-plus exam. This was also true for the Girls' Central School, which was not a secondary modern school. By this selective procedure, it was like a technical school, although not described in name as a technical school.

From April 1976 until April 1978, a new school was built on the Manthorpe estate next to Grantham and District Hospital, on land formerly owned by the foundation governors of the boys' grammar school. The site opened in April 1978, admitting boys only.  The new building cost £850,000 (£ million current value).  When the new site opened again in September 1978, it admitted girls (in the first year) as a coeducational school.  By 1982 was the school fully co-educational.

When the site moved to Manthorpe, it was then described as Grantham's only comprehensive school.

In the 1990s it had around 550 pupils.

It was situated directly north of the Grantham and District Hospital off Sandcliffe Road, between the A607 and the East Coast Main Line, which borders on to the western edge of the school's playing fields.

In 2010 the school merged with the Grantham Church High School to form The Priory Ruskin Academy.

Fire in 1980
Fifth-year Simon Gilchrist Pickering (born 11 April 1965) burned down the main teaching block, causing £450,000 damage. At Lincoln Crown Court he received three months at a youth detention centre in April 1981, and the school was fully operational by October 1981. The fire destroyed thirteen classrooms. The individual had had a minor disagreement with a teacher, and he had wanted to cause a small amount of damage in teenage protest, but the fire took hold instead.

The fire took place at 8.20pm on Wednesday 29 October 1980 during the half term. Fire crews arrived from Brant Broughton and Corby Glen. There were 650 at the school.

Notable former pupils

Boys' Central School
 Mike Brindley, Principal from 1982 to 1997 of Plymouth College of Art and Design (Arts University Plymouth from 2022)
 Tom Broadbridge, film producer
 Eric Chappell, TV writer of Rising Damp
 Vince Eager (Roy Taylor), 1950s singer
 Derek Fowler CBE, Deputy Chairman of British Rail in 1990
 Cyril Hatton, footballer for QPR (scored 64 league goals)
 Sergeant Maurice Verdun Mapletoft (19 March 1916 - February 1997) Hurricane pilot in the Battle of France, shot down in Hurricane N2355 by a Messerschmitt Bf 109 of Lehrgeschwader 2 (LG 2) at 11.30am on 19 May 1940 over Seclin, and baled out wounded with 504 Squadron; from Carlton Scroop, he later moved to Newark-on-Trent then West Bridgford (promoted to Flying Officer on October 1945)
 Richard Nauyokas, from Bad Lads' Army

References

External links
 EduBase
 Merger proposal in January 2009

Defunct schools in Lincolnshire
Educational institutions established in 1920
Educational institutions disestablished in 2010
Schools in Grantham
1920 establishments in England
2010 disestablishments in England